

Karl Koske (27 June 1889 – 8 April 1945) was a German general during World War II. He was a recipient of the Knight's Cross of the Iron Cross of Nazi Germany. Koske was wounded in an air raid and died in a Vienna hospital on 8 April 1945.

Awards and decorations

 Knight's Cross of the Iron Cross on 15 March 1944 as Generalmajor and commander of 212. Infanterie-Division

References

Citations

Bibliography

 

1889 births
1945 deaths
Military personnel from Sarajevo
Austro-Hungarian military personnel of World War I
Major generals of the German Army (Wehrmacht)
Recipients of the Gold German Cross
Recipients of the Knight's Cross of the Iron Cross
German Army personnel killed in World War II
Austro-Hungarian Army officers
Deaths by airstrike during World War II